Neuronal acetylcholine receptor subunit alpha-7, also known as nAChRα7, is a protein that in humans is encoded by the CHRNA7 gene. The protein encoded by this gene is a subunit of certain nicotinic acetylcholine receptors (nAchR).

Function 
The nicotinic acetylcholine receptors (nAChRs) are members of a superfamily of ligand-gated ion channels that mediate fast signal transmission at synapses. The nAChRs are thought to be hetero-pentamers composed of homologous subunits. The proposed structure for each subunit is a conserved N-terminal extracellular domain followed by three conserved transmembrane domains, a variable cytoplasmic loop, a fourth conserved transmembrane domain, and a short C-terminal extracellular region. The protein encoded by this gene forms a homo-oligomeric channel, displays marked permeability to calcium ions and is a major component of brain nicotinic receptors that are blocked by, and highly sensitive to, alpha-bungarotoxin. Once this receptor binds acetylcholine, it undergoes an extensive change in conformation that affects all subunits and leads to opening of an ion-conducting channel across the plasma membrane. This gene is located in a region identified as a major susceptibility locus for juvenile myoclonic epilepsy and a chromosomal location involved in the genetic transmission of schizophrenia. An evolutionarily recent partial duplication event in this region results in a hybrid containing sequence from this gene and a novel FAM7A gene.

Disruption of alpha-7 nicotinic receptors in schizophrenia is believed to contribute at least in part to the abnormally high prevalence of extremely heavy smoking in those affected by the disease.  This observed particularly high nicotine intake compared to the average smoker is hypothesized to be a subconscious effort to activate the low-affinity alpha-7 receptors.

Interactions 
CHRNA7 has been shown to interact with FYN.

Gene expression
The CHRNA7 gene is primarily expressed in the posterior amygdalar nucleus and the field CA3 of Ammon's horn in the mouse, and in the mammillary body in humans. Gene expression patterns from the Allen Brain Atlases can be seen here.

See also 
 Alpha-7 nicotinic receptor
 Nicotinic acetylcholine receptor
 Acetylcholine receptor

References

Further reading

External links 
 
 

Ion channels
Nicotinic acetylcholine receptors